Matthew Gold (born June 14, 1988 in San Antonio, Texas) is an American soccer player.

Career

College and Amateur
Gold began his youth career playing for Lonestar Soccer Club in Austin, Texas, where he also attended St. Stephen's Episcopal School, a prestigious academic day and boarding school with a soccer and tennis academy intended for students with an interest in the college and professional levels. He then went on to play four years of college soccer for Ohio State University. During his college years he also played for Austin Aztex U23 in the USL Premier Development League.

Professional
Gold was selected by Toronto FC in the third round (43rd overall) of the 2011 MLS SuperDraft, and was officially signed by the club on March 18, 2011. He made his professional debut on April 30, 2011, coming on as a substitute in a game against Seattle Sounders FC. Gold made his CONCACAF Champions League debut in a group stage match against UNAM Pumas as a second half sub for Richard Eckersley on September 27, the game ended in a 1-1 home draw. He was released by Toronto in November 2011.

Gold signed with expansion side San Antonio Scorpions FC of the North American Soccer League on February 2, 2012.

After his release from San Antonio, Gold moved to USL Pro club Charlotte Eagles on February 14, 2013.

Matt's former boss Mike "Mosey" Gromosiak has been an instrumental influence in his career and was named his life coach in 2016.

Honours

Toronto FC
Canadian Championship (1): 2011

Club Statistics

Last updated on September 27, 2011

References

External links
 
 Ohio Buckeyes profile

1988 births
Living people
American soccer players
American expatriate soccer players
Association football defenders
Ohio State Buckeyes men's soccer players
Austin Aztex U23 players
Toronto FC players
San Antonio Scorpions players
Charlotte Eagles players
Expatriate soccer players in Canada
Toronto FC draft picks
USL League Two players
Major League Soccer players
North American Soccer League players
USL Championship players